Montfort-l'Amaury is a commune in the Yvelines department in the Île-de-France region, north central France. The name comes from Amaury I de Montfort, the first seigneur (lord) of Montfort.

Geography
Montfort-l'Amaury lies north of the Rambouillet Forest. It is located at the foot of low hills, at about 130 m above sea level.

History
King Robert II built a castle in 996 in the hills of Montfort. Montfort-l'Amaury was the stronghold of the Montfort family from the start of the 11th century. Amaury I built the ramparts.

The Comté de Montfort was related to the Duchy of Brittany following the marriage of Yolande de Dreux-Montfort with Arthur of Brittany in 1294. It returned to the crown of France when Brittany became a part of France under Francis I. The castle was destroyed by the English during the Hundred Years' War.

Sites of interest

Ruins of the castle 
Maison de Maurice Ravel, which is now a museum  . Maurice Ravel lived here from 1921 until his death.
Château de Groussay, built in the 19th century

People
Jean Anouilh, dramatist
Colette Darfeuil, actress
Henri George Doll, scientist
Jean Monnet, architect of European Unity
Simon de Montfort, 6th Earl of Leicester (born in the castle, 1208)
Maurice Ravel, composer
Charles Aznavour, singer
Ambroise Roux (1921-1999), CEO of Compagnie générale d'électricité (later known as Alcatel) from 1970 to 1981, lived and died in Montfort-l'Amaury.
Omar Sy, actor

Twin towns
Nickenich, Germany

See also
Communes of the Yvelines department

References

External links

Official website
Pictures of Castle Montfort l'Amaury 
Photos by Amaury Laporte, free to use for non commercial purposes
Information about Montfort l'Amaury

Communes of Yvelines
Burial sites of the House of Montfort